Thiodictyon is a genus of gram-negative bacterium classified within purple sulfur bacteria (PSB).

 T. elegans forms "netlike aggregates under certain culture conditions." It is obligately phototrophic and strictly anaerobic.
 T. bacillosum does not form netlike aggregates, only clumps.
 "Ca. T. syntrophicum" grows best under micro-oxic and low light conditions. There has only been one successful enrichment of "Ca. T. syntrophicum"; "Ca. T. syntrophicum" strain Cad16T.
 "Ca. T. intracellulare" is reported in 2021 as a symbiont of Pseudoblepharisma tenue. It has lost a great portion of its genome including known genes for sulfur dissimilation, but the remaining sequence place it quite close to "Ca. T. syntrophicum".

Classification 
Thiodictyon belongs to the family Chromatiaceae and class Gammaproteobacteria. "Ca. T. syntrophicum" is known to be related to the genera Lamprocystis, Thiocystis and Thiocapsa. Strain Cad16T was previously assigned to the genus Lamprocystis, but was recently reassigned to the genus Thiodictyon by Peduzzi et al. Matrix-assisted laser desorption/ionization time of flight mass spectrometry (MALDI-TOF MS) was used to separate Cad16T from Lamprocystis due to differences in cell morphology/arrangement, caretenoid groups and chemolithotrophic growth; all of which are important factors used to consider Cad16T a member of the genus Thiodictyon rather than the genus Lamprocystis.

Genetics 
The 16S rRNA from the type strains of the two recognized species have been sequenced. The two proposed Candidatus species have had their whole genomes sequenced. GTDB reports that several whole genomes from metagenomic samples, not yet named, are also available, clustering into three additional species-level groups.

Strain Cad16T 
Cad16T is a novel strain of "Ca. T. syntrophicum", which was isolated from the chemocline of a crenogenic meromictic lake. 16S rRNA gene sequence data shows that Cad16T is closely related to Thiodictyon bacillosum DSM234T (99.2% sequence similarity) and Thiodictyon elegans DSM232T (98.9% sequence similarity).

Environment 
The Cad16T strain of "Ca. T. syntrophicum" was isolated from Lake Cadagno. This lake is crenogenic and meromictic, and its layers create diverse ecological niches which support the growth of diverse and often novel species. Lake Cadagno is euxinic, meaning it is both anoxic and sulphidic at depth. Its chemocline, which occurs at approximately 12 m, is quite narrow and has high concentrations of sulfide, sulfate, oxygen and light. A turbidity maximum also correlates with the chemocline, and this is caused by high concentrations of anaerobic phototrophic sulfur bacteria.

Carbon fixation 
"Ca. T. syntrophicum" strain Cad16T has the capability for CO2 fixation, and was found to play a key role in the overall inorganic carbon fixation that occurred in Lake Cadagno.  Within the chemocline of Lake Cadagno, Cad16T and another isolate from the lake, CadA31 (a PSB), were the two most efficient CO2 fixing strains, and researchers found that CO2 fixation occurred in both light and dark conditions. However, Cad16T was most likely the main contributor to light and dark carbon fixation within the chemocline of the lake, as Storelli et al. found that this strain assimilated approximately 25.9% of all hypothetical carbon fixed within the chemocline.

Sulfur cycling 
Strain Cad16T of "Ca. T. syntrophicum" is a species of PSB. Researchers discovered that strain Cad16T creates and stores sulfur globules intracellularly. The pure cultures of Cad16T were found to utilize sulfide and elemental sulfur as their electron donors.

Cad16T is known to have syntrophic associations and cell-to-cell aggregation with Desulfocapsa sp. Desulfocapsa sp. is a sulfate reducing and sulfur disproportionating bacteria found in both mixed culture and within the natural environment.

References 

Chromatiales
Lithoautotrophs